St Rhwydrus's Church is a medieval church in the village of Cemlyn on the Isle of Anglesey, Wales. The building dates from the mid-12th century and underwent renovations in the 19th century. It was designated a Grade II*-listed building on 5 December 1970.

History and location
St Rhwydrus's Church is situated in an isolated location near the village of Cemlyn. The church was first mentioned in the Norwich Taxation of 1254. The oldest part of the structure dates from the 12th century, which consists of the nave and rounded doorway. It was granted Grade II*-listed status on 5 December 1970.

References

External links
 

Grade II* listed churches in Anglesey
12th-century church buildings in Wales